CQS is a London-based global multi-strategy credit-focused asset management firm. It launched its first credit strategy in 2000 and now manages a range of investment mandates. Specific investment capabilities include convertibles, asset backed securities, credit, loans, structured credit, and equities. 

Their investors include pension funds, insurance companies, sovereign wealth funds, funds of funds, endowments and foundations, and private banks.

Leadership

CQS was founded in 1999 by Michael Hintze, who serves as the Group Executive Chairman and Senior Investment Officer. Prior to establishing CQS, Hintze was European Head of Convertible Bonds at Credit Suisse First Boston (CSFB) and Head of UK Equity Trading and European Convertible Bond Trading at Goldman Sachs. 

In 2014, he was asked to serve on the International Advisory Panel for the Australian government's Financial Services Inquiry. He also served as a Member of the Market Practitioners' Panel for the UK government's Fair and Effective Markets Review. He serves as a Member of the Vatican Bank Board and sits on the Audit Committee of the Duchy of Cornwall.

Hintze was ranked #5 on Financial News’ FN100 Most Influential list in the hedge fund category. He was also listed by The Wall Street Journal as one of five "2012 All-Stars". Hintze is also a philanthropist, and his charity, the Hintze Family Charitable Foundation, has provided funding to over 200 charities and organisations.

Former London Stock Exchange chief Xavier Rolet joined CQS as chief executive officer (CEO) in January 2019.

Governance and board of directors
CQS is governed by a board of directors, with subcommittees.

The chair of the board is Sir Michael Peat, an accountant by training who also serves as an independent non-executive on the Board of Deloitte UK, amongst other positions. Non-Executive Directors on the Board include Adrian Collins, Catherine Cripps, Richard Hayden, James Shinn, former Australian foreign minister Alexander Downer, former UK City minister Lord Myners, former Chief of the Defence Staff of the British Armed Forces General Lord Richards, and chief executive of Rockefeller & Co Jeffrey Reuben III.

Assets under management and returns

As of December 2018, CQS had $18.1 billion in assets under management.

According to Bloomberg, CQS's main fund gained 30.4% in 2016, posting its best annual returns since 2012.

In April 2020, it was reported CQS's Directional Opportunities Fund posted its biggest ever 30% decline in March.

Office locations

CQS has offices in London, Hong Kong, New York, and Sydney.  Affiliates within the group are regulated by the Financial Conduct Authority (FCA) in London, the Securities and Futures Commission (SFC) in Hong Kong and the Australian Securities and Investments Commission (ASIC) in Sydney, and registered with the Securities and Exchange Commission (SEC) in New York.

CQS opened its Sydney, Australia office in 2010 and expanded its presence in the country in 2011.

Awards

CQS was included in Institutional Investor's 2012 and 2013 lists of the Top single-manager hedge fund firms by assets under management and Barron's 2012, 2013, and 2015 lists of the "Best 100 Hedge Funds".  Bloomberg ranked the CQS Directional Opportunities Fund #3 on its list of the top-performing large hedge funds in 2012. Bloomberg later listed CQS Directional Opportunities Fund #4 on its list of top-performing funds in 2016.

In May 2013, CQS was given three awards at the Financial News Awards for Excellence in Institutional Hedge Fund Management, Europe: Best Hedge Fund Manager Overall, Best Hedge Fund Manager in Credit, and Best Multi-Hedge Fund Manager.

Corporate social responsibility

CQS supports a number of charities and organisations including: 100 Women in Finance, Amber, Australia Day Foundation, EMpower, Fight for Sight, Great Ormond Street Hospital, Greenhouse Sports, Institute of Cancer Research, Institute of Economic Affairs, IC Tennis, Mission Possible, The National Gallery, The National Theatre, Never Such Innocence, New Ways, No Greater Sacrifice, NSPCC, Oxford University Association Football Club, The Royal Flying Doctor Service, sitesALIVE!, and St Martin-in-the-Fields Charity.

Miscellaneous

CQS is known for its successful bets in the US subprime mortgage market.

In May 2012, CQS was reported to be on the opposite side of the infamous JPMorgan trade by Bruno Iskil, in which JPMorgan lost more than $2billion because of its massive position in U.S. credit derivatives.

Adam Werritty reportedly once had a desk at the company’s London base.

References

Hedge fund firms in the United Kingdom